The 2000 Tour de Romandie was the 54th edition of the Tour de Romandie cycle race and was held from 2 May to 7 May 2000. The race started in Locarno and finished in Geneva. The race was won by Paolo Savoldelli of the Saeco team.

General classification

References

2000
Tour de Romandie